Jason Banks may refer to:

 Jason Banks (American football) (born 1985), American football defensive end 
 Jason Banks (footballer) (born 1968), former English footballer
 Jason Banks (bowls) (born 1996), Scottish lawn bowler